Edmund Rice (c. 1594 – 3 May 1663), was an early settler to Massachusetts Bay Colony born in Suffolk, England. He lived in Stanstead, Suffolk and Berkhamsted, Hertfordshire before sailing with his family to America. He landed in the Colony in summer or fall of 1638, thought to be first living in the town of Watertown, Massachusetts. Shortly thereafter he was a founder of Sudbury in 1638, and later in life was one of the thirteen petitioners for the founding of Marlborough in 1656. He was a deacon in the  Puritan Church, and served in town politics as a selectman and judge. He also served five years as a member of the Great and General Court, the combined colonial legislature and judicial court of Massachusetts.

Biography
Edmund Rice's rough birth date of 1594 is reckoned from a 3 April 1656 court deposition in Massachusetts in which he stated that he was 62 years old. His likely birthplace, somewhere in Suffolk in East Anglia, is found through the town of his marriage and of his earliest children's births.  Many of the church records from 1594 in Suffolk are lost, so any record of his birth or the names of his parents or any of his forebears is unknown. Edmund Rice had a presumed brother, Henry (c. 1580-1621), who married Elizabeth Frost (sister of Edmund's wife Thomasine) on 12 November 1605 at St. James Church, Stanstead, Suffolk .  Repeated attempts to find record of Edmund Rice's birth or the birth of his presumed brother Henry in church or civil records of the Stanstead, Sudbury, Haverhill, and Bury St. Edmunds region of Suffolk have not been successful and the records are presumed to be lost.

Considerable information about the early life of Edmund Rice in England can be gleaned from his children's baptismal records, as well as land ownership and other public records in Stanstead, Suffolk and  Berkhamsted, Hertfordshire. He moved from Stanstead to Berkhamsted sometime in 1626, based upon the baptismal dates of his children Thomas and Lydia. That same year as a newcomer in town, Rice was named as a joint trustee along with Rev. Thomas Newman of a £50 grant for the benefit of the poor from King Charles I given on the occasion of his coronation. Under the incumbency of Rev. Newman, Rice served as a churchwarden at St. Peter's Church and acted as overseer of the poor for eight years. As a result of a royal inquisition held on 1 April 1634, funds remaining in the custody of Rice and Newman were to be transferred to the bailiff and burgesses of Berkhamsted as part of an effort to transfer and consolidate several royal charity grants for administration under civil authority. There is no record in Berkhamsted of Rice paying taxes on his land in 1638, possibly due to its sale to finance his trip to America.

There is no surviving record of Edmund Rice's voyage to America with his family, but it was surmised to have occurred between the 13 March 1638 baptism of his son Joseph in Berkhamsted and the petition to the Great and General Court to found Sudbury, Massachusetts 6 September 1638, showing all the Sudbury petitioners residing in Watertown, MA.  However, the 1638 petition to the General Court to found Sudbury did not explicitly mention Rice's name, so documentation of Rice's presumed short-term residence in Watertown is poor.  The first documented record of his presence in Massachusetts is in the Township Book of Sudbury prior to 4 April 1639 in which he was already serving as a selectman.

Between 1638 and 1657, Rice resided in Sudbury where he became a leader in the community.  Sumner Chilton Powell wrote in his 1964 Pulitzer Prize-winning Puritan Village: The Formation of a New England Town, "Not only did Rice become the largest individual landholder in Sudbury, but he represented his new town in the Massachusetts legislature for five years and devoted at least eleven of his last fifteen years to serving as selectman and judge of small causes." He was appointed on 4 September 1639 by the General Court to lay out the roads and lots of Sudbury, and he was granted  of land near the original Sudbury meetinghouse . On 3 April 1640, Rice was granted  in southeastern Sudbury near the Old Connecticut Path.  He served as a selectman in Sudbury in 1639 and 1640, and subsequently for several years between 1644 and 1656.  He was designated by the General Court as a freeman on 13 May 1640, and was first elected as a deputy (representative) of the Great and General Court in October 1640. He was later appointed by the General Court on 2 June 1641 as a Judge of Small Causes for Sudbury, serving until 1648 in the appointed position.  Then from 1648 until 1654 he was elected and reelected locally in Sudbury as one of the municipal judges. He was reelected for another year term as a deputy of the General Court in 1643. In 1644 Rice and two other Sudbury residents (Peter Noyes and Thomas Mayhew) were appointed to survey the farm properties of the estate of the deceased Joseph Glover near the southeastern boundary of Sudbury to be transferred to Harvard College President Henry Dunster who had married Glover's widow Elizabeth and assumed responsibility for the Glover children.  On 18 June 1645, Rice and his colleagues reported to the General Court on their survey. In 1648, Rice was ordained as a Deacon in the  Puritan Church at Sudbury. He was appointed by the General Court on 22 May 1651 as a member of a commission to settle a boundary dispute between Watertown and Sudbury, and he was reelected as a deputy of the General Court in each of the three years from 1652 through 1654. Again in May 1656, Rice and Peter Noyes were called upon by the General Court for their expertise to survey  of land purchased by John Stone of Sudbury from the Indians, which was supplemented by a grant of the General Court to Stone of an additional  in what is now Framingham. Stone erected a gristmill on his property of Stone's End in 1656 that would later become the village of Saxonville. Again in 1662 at the behest of the General Court, Rice and John Howe of Marlborough were called upon to survey  of land in the area now known as Framingham that they deemed to be worth £10 to be awarded by the General Court to Thomas Danforth as compensation for his services to the Colony and Harvard College.

Edmund Rice was particularly successful in his own real estate transactions. After selling his  of land and homestead near the Sudbury meetinghouse on 1 September 1642 to John Moore, Rice established his residence on 13 September 1642 on his 20 acres of land abutting  Henry Dunster's farm near the Old Connecticut Path in southeastern Sudbury. Within a year, Philemon Whale and Thomas Axtell, former town mates and kin from Berkhamstead, England established their homesteads on adjacent lots nearby. In October 1643 Rice sold Philemon Whale  of land and a house near the Old Connecticut Path in southern Sudbury and also that same month he sold  of adjacent land to Thomas Axtell. But only three years later on 6 May 1646, Rice, along with his son Edward Rice and Philemon Whale, administered the estate of the deceased Thomas Axtell and he purchased back the land from the estate shortly thereafter. On 8 April 1657, Rice purchased the  "Jennison Farm" in the southeastern part of Sudbury. These lands in Framingham were passed on to Rice's son Henry in 1659, and became known as Rice's End.

As the Enclosure Movement was a contentious political issue in England, the issue of land tenure was also highly contentious in 17th-century Massachusetts Bay Colony and in Sudbury in particular. Open-field or communal farming was practiced in most of Sudbury, following traditions of the commons and governance practices brought from central and western England during the early 17th century. Rice and twelve other dissenters from Sudbury who were interested in 'closed-field' or owner-operator farming, as it was practiced in southeastern England, petitioned the Great and General Court in 1656 to create the town of Marlborough where individual ownership of farmland was to be exclusively practiced. Rice was elected as selectman of Marlborough in 1657 as the town was being established. The town was formally chartered on 12 June 1660 by the General Court. According to Powell (1963), the founding of Marlborough with exclusive closed-field land tenure was a seminal event in establishing the predominant freehold or fee simple land tenure system of America. Rice was reelected as selectman in Marlborough every year after 1657 until his death.

Edmund Rice died on 3 May 1663 in Marlborough, Massachusetts, and is presumed to be buried at the Old North Cemetery (site of the first Sudbury Meeting House) in what is now Wayland, Massachusetts .  Probate records show that his wife, Mercy, was executrix and that his estate including lands and homes in both Sudbury and Marlborough was valued at £743, 8s, & 4p, which was a considerable sum for the time. For decades, the Edmund Rice estate was disputed in part by heirs of John Moore (1610-1673). The issue of land ownership was eventually settled in 1716 by a transfer of land to John Moore's son, Joseph Moore (1647-1725), by Edmund's grandson (a son of Matthew) Isaac Rice (1668-1717). The only surviving artifact known to be owned by Edmund Rice and his second wife Mercy Brigham Rice is an antique bible box from the pre-Elizabethan Tudor Period (early 16th Century); it was brought from England by Mercy when she sailed to Massachusetts in 1635. The bible box was donated to the Worcester Historical Museum by Thomas Brigham Rice (1817-1914) in 1910, and it is recognized as one of the earliest known pieces of furniture with a New England history.

Family data
Edmund Rice was married to Thomasine Frost (1600–1654) on 15 October 1618 in St. Mary's Church, Bury St. Edmunds, Suffolk, England  and they had 10 children including:
 Mary Rice, baptized 23 August 1619 at St. James Church Stanstead, Suffolk, England, possibly married Thomas Axtell of Bushey on 10 October 1638 at St. Albans. 
 Henry Rice, baptized 13 February 1620 O.S./1621 N.S. at St. James Church, Stanstead, Suffolk, died 10 February 1710/11 at Framingham, married Elizabeth Moore 1 February 1643/44. Along with his father, Henry was among the first grantees of a  house lot in the first Sudbury settlement in September 1639. Henry Rice and his family were among the first European settlers of the area southwest of Sudbury on the Old Connecticut Path later to become Framingham.
 Edward Rice, baptized 20 October 1622 at St. James Church, Stanstead, Suffolk, died 15 August 1712 at Marlborough, MA, married Agnes Bent in 1646.  Edward Rice was one of the original inhabitants of Marlborough having been granted  on 26 November 1660. From 1687 until his death he was one of the two deacons of First Parish in Marlborough (now First Church in Marlborough).
 Thomas Rice, baptized 26 January 1625/26 at St. James Church, Stanstead, Suffolk, died 16 November 1681 at Sudbury, MA, married Mary King 1652.  Thomas Rice was one of the original inhabitants of Marlborough, having been granted  on 26 November 1660. Thomas's home was a fortified garrison house during King Philip's War of 1675–78.
 Lydia Rice, baptized 9 March 1627/28 at St. Peter's Church, Berkhamsted, Hertfordshire, died 5 April 1675, at Boston, MA, married Hugh Drury 1645 in Sudbury. Hugh Drury was a carpenter by trade and the family resided in Boston. Drury became a member of the Ancient and Honorable Artillery Company in 1659 and was subsequently its Lieutenant.
 Matthew Rice, baptized 28 February 1628/29 at St. Peter's Church, Berkhamsted, died 1717 at Sudbury, MA, married Martha Lamson 2 November 1654.  Matthew resided on the former "Jennison Farm" tract acquired in 1657 by Edmund in the easternmost part of Sudbury.
 Daniel Rice, baptized 1 November 1632 at St. Peter's Church, Berkhamsted, died 10 November 1632 at Berkhamsted.
 Samuel Rice, baptized 12 November 1634 at St. Peter's Church, Berkhamsted, died 25 February 1684/85 at Marlborough, MA, married (1) Elizabeth King 8 November 1655, (2) Mary (Dix) Browne September 1668, and (3) Sarah (White) Hosmer 13 December 1676. Samuel Rice was one of the original inhabitants of Marlborough, having been granted  on 26 November 1660. He served in the Massachusetts Militia in 1675 at Marlborough during King Philip's War.
 Joseph Rice, baptized 13 March 1637/38, at St. Peter's Church, Berkhamsted, died 23 December 1711 at Stow, MA, married (1) Mercy (aka Martha) King 4 May 1658, (2) Mary Beers in 1670, and (3) Sarah (Prescott) Wheeler on 22 February 1677/78.  Joseph Rice was one of the original inhabitants of Marlborough, having been granted  on 26 November 1660. Joseph's home was a fortified garrison house during King Philip's War of 1675–78. Joseph Rice served as a representative in the Massachusetts General Court in 1683 and 1698.
 Benjamin Rice, born 31 May 1640 at Sudbury, MA, died 19 December 1713 at Sudbury, MA, married (1) Mary Browne on 2 June 1661, and (2) Mary (Chamberlain) Graves on 1 April 1691.  Along with his father and several brothers, Benjamin Rice was an original inhabitant of Marlborough having been granted  on 26 November 1660.

After the death of Thomasine Frost Rice on 13 June 1654 in Sudbury, MA, Edmund Rice married Mercy Brigham (c 1616-1693) on 1 March 1655 in Sudbury, MA.  Mercy Brigham was the widow of Thomas Brigham (1603–1653). This marriage began the long association between the Rice and Brigham families. The maiden name of Mercy Brigham, often cited as Hurd, is uncertain due to lack of any primary documentation. Two daughters were born to Edmund and Mercy Rice as follows:
 Lydia Rice, born circa 1657 at Sudbury, MA, died 26 May 1718, married James Hawkins, Jr. circa 1678, probably in Boston. Hawkins was a stonemason & bricklayer by trade.
 Ruth Rice, born 29 September 1659 at Marlborough, MA, died 30 March 1742 at Glastonbury, Connecticut, married Capt. Samuel Welles, grandson of Thomas Welles on 20 June 1683

Edmund Rice's descendants 

Descendants of Edmund Rice had been meeting annually at the old Rice homestead in Wayland since 5 September 1851. Documentation of Edmund Rice's descendants began with the 1858 publication of a genealogy of the Rice family by Andrew Henshaw Ward (1784-1864).  Its publication was funded by a committee formed at the 1856 annual reunion consisting of five Rice descendants, including: George Merrick Rice (1808-1894), then president of the Worcester Common Council; Edmund Rice (1813-1888) (father of stage producer Edward E. Rice); his uncle, Levi Goodnough (1804-1886), a physician from Sudbury; Anson Rice (1798-1875) (postmaster of Northborough and grandfather of author Wallace Rice); and U.S. Congressman Constantine C. Esty (1824-1912). Despite the difficulties of communication and transportation in the 1850s, Ward was able to document over 6,200 Edmund Rice descendants and spouses, mostly in the New England region.

On 7 October 1903, Edmund Rice descendants were on hand to dedicate the homesite marker of Jonas Rice, a grandson of Edmund and founder of Worcester, Massachusetts. A few years later on 30 August 1912, shortly after the old family homestead in Wayland had been lost by fire, Rice descendants in Massachusetts formally organized the Edmund Rice (1638) Association (ERA), led primarily by Nellie Rice Fiske (1856-1934) a school teacher from Wayland. At that first ERA meeting, Eustace Bond Rice (1871-1938) a professor of music theory at the New England Conservatory who had grown up in the old Rice homestead was elected as the association's first president, and they set out to raise funds to erect the homesite and cemetery monuments.

Beginning in the early 20th century, and partially aided by the compilation and publication of Massachusetts vital records by Franklin Pierce Rice (1852-1919), among others, the ERA undertook the task of building upon Ward's pioneering genealogy by verifying and better documenting Edmund's descendants. In the early 1930s, Alexander Hamilton Rice, Jr. (1875-1956) commissioned genealogist Mary Lovering Holman (1868-1947) of the New England Historic Genealogical Society to examine existing information on Edmund Rice and produce an updated genealogy.  On 10 January 1934, the ERA incorporated under the laws of Massachusetts as the Edmund Rice (1638) Association, Inc. For the 1938 tricentennial of Edmund's immigration to America, the ERA published Elsie Hawes Smith's Edmund Rice and his Family and in the 1940s and 1950s continued correspondence and gatherings of Rice descendants. Beginning in December 1960, the ERA began publishing a quarterly newsletter to disseminate genealogical and historical information about Edmund Rice, his ancestors and his descendants. By 1968, the ERA had compiled and verified 26,000 descendants of Edmund after publication of their first addendum to Ward's genealogy. During the 1970s and 1980s, the ERA published further genealogical research findings in three additional volumes, and in the mid-1990s, the Association began transferring all of their print records into an electronic format. By 2017, the ERA electronic database of known Edmund Rice descendants into the 14th and 15th generations had exceeded 260,000 individuals. Using data from the ERA electronic database, a total of 2.7 million of Edmund's descendants has been estimated to be in the 12th generation, with a total estimated 4.4 million descendants cumulatively in the first twelve generations.

In 1980, Edmund Rice descendant Corinne M. Snow (1925-2008) wrote a historical fiction novella titled The Deacons based upon the primary historical records of Edmund Rice and his family and Powell's (1963) Puritan Village: The Formation of a New England Town.   The story covers the life of the Rice family in the time period beginning about 1621 in Suffolk, England, through their immigration to Massachusetts in 1638, until the 1713 founding of Worcester by Edmund's grandchildren Jonas, Gershom, and James.  It provides an interpretation of the family's experiences in Stanstead, Suffolk, as well as in Berkhamsted, and it offers a purely fictional account of their departure from Southampton Harbor aboard the Confidence to Watertown, Massachusetts.  The story further provides an insight into the Rice family's life in Puritan Massachusetts during the political controversies generated as Sudbury and Marlborough were being founded and the experiences of the family during King Philip's War of 1675–78.

Genetic genealogy
Since 2000 with the initial leadership of Robert V. Rice, the ERA has conducted extensive haplotype DNA testing on males known to or believed to have descended from seven sons of Edmund. Enough data has been collected from living male descendants of Edmund's sons to reconstruct Edmund's Y-DNA haplotype. These data have served to support conclusions of Edmund's birth in Suffolk, East Anglia and provide additional evidence to dispel a misleading early 20th-century claim that Edmund Rice was descended from Welsh royalty. The 111 tested (Y-STR) Y-chromosome markers (e.g. DYS391 = 10; DYS392 = 11; DYS393 = 10; DYS426 = 11; DYS447 = 23; DYS454 = 11; DYS455 = 8; YCA-IIa,b = 19, 21) from known descendants of Edmund are consistent with Haplogroup I-M253; this is an exceedingly rare haplogroup among the Welsh but is relatively common among inhabitants of East Anglia.

The genetic testing of Edmund Rice descendants has also served to confirm two different direct male descendant lines in which there had been a change in surname. Data showed direct patrilineal descendants with the surname King, confirming a name change had occurred with Samuel Rice 1667-1713 (aka Lt. Samuel Rice King). Notable direct descendants of Edmund with the surname of King include U.S. Senator William H. King (1863–1949) and his son, U.S. Member of Congress David S. King (1917–2009), and David's daughter Jody, who served as the Director of Peace Corps. Likewise some individuals with the surname of Royce also have been found to have Y-STR genetic markers identical to Edmund Rice, confirming a name change by Alpheus Rice 1787-1871 (aka Capt. Alpheus Royce). A notable direct patrilineal descendant of Edmund with the surname of Royce is George E. Royce (1829-1903), a businessman and state legislator from Vermont. In addition to confirmation of surname changes in the direct patrilineal lines, formerly presumed descendants of Edmund have been ruled out by way of genetic mismatching.

The genetic testing also revealed Y-STR genetic markers of Edmund Rice among some male members of the Mohawk nation who have the surname of Rice.  The tested individuals are most probably descended from Silas Rice, one of four Rice boys from two families who were captured during Queen Anne's War by an Indian raid on 8 August 1704 in Marlborough (in the part of town then known as Chauncey that later was renamed as Westborough), Massachusetts, and taken to Kahnawake, Canada, where they were adopted and raised by Mohawk families. They became assimilated as Mohawk, marrying local women of the tribe. Ashur Rice was ransomed after four years and returned to Massachusetts. Actress Alexandrea Kawisenhawe Rice, (b. 1972, Mohawk) of Kahnawake, is a notable descendant of Edmund Rice and his great-grandson Silas. She grew up in Brooklyn, where a Mohawk community formed of families of ironworkers.

References

Notes

Citations

Sources
 Anon. (1898) Middlesex and Hertfordshire Notes and Queries, Volume IV. F.E. Robinson Publishers, London. web version
 Bolton, Ethel Stanwood. (1904). Some Descendants of John Moore of Sudbury, Massachusetts. Press of David Clapp and Son, Boston. 22pp.  web version
 Bond, Henry. (1855). Genealogies of the Families and Descendants of the Early Settlers of Watertown, Massachusetts. Little, Brown and Company, Boston. web version
 Brigham, Willard Irving Tyler, Emma Elizabeth Brigham, and William Erastus Brigham. (1907). The History of the Brigham Family; A Record of Several Thousand Descendants of Thomas Brigham the Emigrant, 1603-1653. The Grafton Press, New York. 810pp.  web version
 Brigg, William (1895). The Herts Genealogist and Antiquary, Volume 1.  William Brigg, Harpenden., St. Albans. 384pp + index.  web version
 Cobb, John Wolstenholme (1883). Two Lectures on the History and Antiquities of Berkhamsted. Nichols and Sons, London. web version
 Colket, Meredith Bright, Jr. and Edward N. Dunlop. (1936). The English Ancestry of Anne Marbury Hutchinson and Katherine Marbury Scott: Including their Descent and that of John Dryden, Poet-Laureate, from Magna Charta Sureties with Notes on the English Connections of the Settlers William Wentworth and Christopher Lawson of New Hampshire and Francis Marbury of Maryland. Magee Publishing Company, Philadelphia. 60pp.  web version
 Cressy, David. (1987). Coming Over: Migration and Communication between England and New England in the Seventeenth Century. Chapter 6 'The vast and furious ocean,' Cambridge University Press. 
 Hudson, Alfred Sereno. (1889). The History of Sudbury, Massachusetts. Town of Sudbury. 661pp Download PDF
 New England Historic Genealogical Society. (1849). The New England Historical and Genealogical Register, Volume III.  Samuel G. Drake, Boston.  web version
 Paige, Lucius Robinson (1849). List of Freemen of Massachusetts 1631–1691 (1978 edition). Vol. III of The New England Historical and Genealogical Register. 
 Parkman, Ebenezer. (1769). The Story of the Rice Boys: Captured by the Indians 8 August 1704. Published in 1906 by the Westborough Historical Society, Westborough, MA. 7pp.  Download PDF
 Parr, James L. and Kevin A. Swope. 2009. Framingham Legends and Lore. The History Press, Charleston, South Carolina. 
 Powell, Sumner Chilton. (1963). Puritan Village: The Formation of a New England Town.  Wesleyan University Press, Middletown, CT 215pp. 
 Rice, Charles Elmer (1911). By the Name of Rice: An Historical Sketch of Deacon Edmund Rice The Pilgrim 1594-1663 and His Descendants to the Fourth Generation. Williams Printing, Alliance Ohio. 84pp.  web version
 Schutz, John A. (1997). Legislators of the Massachusetts General Court 1691-1780: A Biographical Dictionary. Northeastern University Press, Boston. 
 Shurtleff, Nathaniel Bradstreet (ed.), (1853). Records of the Governor and Company of the Massachusetts Bay in New England, Vol. 1, 1628-1641. Press of William White, Boston.  web version
 Shurtleff, Nathaniel Bradstreet (ed.), (1854), Records of the Governor and Company of the Massachusetts Bay in New England, Vol. 3, 1644-1657. Press of William White, Boston.  web version
 Smith, Elsie Hawes (1938). Edmund Rice and His Family. Edmund Rice (1638) Association, Inc. 100pp. ERA Books web version
 Smith, Elsie Hawes (1954). More About Those Rices. The Meador Press, Boston. 109pp.  web version
 Snow, Corinne McLaughlin (1980). The Deacons. Harmon Associates Publishing, Delmar, NY 12054 USA. 257pp. 
 Temple, Josiah Howard (1887). History of Framingham, Massachusetts, Early Known as Danforth's Farms 1640-1880. Town of Framingham. 794pp. web version
 Trask, William B. (1863). A Brief Memoir of Andrew Henshaw Ward. J. Munsell Publishers, Albany, NY. web version
 Urwick, William (1884). Nonconformity in Herts: Being Lectures upon the Nonconforming Worthies of St. Albans, and Memorials of Puritanism and Nonconformity in all the parishes of the County of Hertford. Hazell, Watson, and Viney Publishers, London. 875pp. web version
 Ward, Andrew Henshaw. (1858). A Genealogical History of the Rice Family: Descendants of Deacon Edmund Rice. C. Benjamin Richardson Publisher, Boston. 379pp. Download PDF
 Worcester Society of Antiquity. (1903). Exercises Held at the Dedication of a Memorial to Major Jonas Rice, the First Permanent Settler of Worcester, Massachusetts, Wednesday, October 7, 1903. Charles Hamilton Press, Worcester. 72pp. web version

External links
Edmund Rice (1638) Association
  Edmund Rice (1638) Association at Facebook

1590s births
1663 deaths
People from Sudbury, Suffolk
People from Berkhamsted
Kingdom of England emigrants to Massachusetts Bay Colony
People of colonial Massachusetts
People from Sudbury, Massachusetts
People from Marlborough, Massachusetts
American Puritans
New England Puritanism
Deacons
Members of the colonial Massachusetts House of Representatives
American judges
Edgar Rice Burroughs